This is a list of vehicles used by the U.S. Army Signal Corps from World War I through World War II.

Designations
Vehicles specifically designed or adapted for the Signal Corps were initially designated by a "K" number. The K-number was later phased out along with the Signal Corps Radio nomenclature system, and was replaced by a "V" number under the Joint Electronics Type Designation System (JETDS).

K numbers

V numbers

 JETDS was adopted 16 February 1943

See also

 Signal Corps Radio
 List of military vehicles of World War II
 List of U.S. military vehicles by supply catalog designation
 List of U.S. military vehicles by model number
 List of military electronics of the United States

Notes

References
 TM 9-2800 Standard Military Motor Vehicles. dated 1 sept. 1943
 TM 9-2800 Military vehicles dated October 1947
 TM 11-227 Signal Communication Directory. dated 10 April 1944
 TM 11-364 K-44-B Truck and earth borer equipment HD
 TM 11-487 Electrical Communication systems Equipment. dated 2  October 1944
 TM 11-487-C1 military standardization handbook dated 1965
 T/O&E 44-16, Headquarters and Headquarters Battery, Antiaircraft Artillery Gun Battalion, Mobile, dated 17 November 1944
 T/O&E 11-57, Armored Signal Company, dated 15 September 1943

External links
 https://books.google.com/books?id=3XcMAAAAYAAJ&printsec=frontcover&dq=ameraca%27s+munitions+1918#PPA1,M1 production numbers and manufacturers
 http://sdr.lib.umich.edu/cgi/pt?id=mdp.39015062770162 signal corps storage catalogue 1920
 https://earlyradiohistory.us/1916sc.htm early systems
 http://www.monmouth.army.mil/historian/photodisp.php?fname=Field_Radio_Set_circa1908.jpg&dirname=Radio first mobile radio?
 https://web.archive.org/web/20081028220440/http://www.transchool.eustis.army.mil/Museum/ExhibitsIndex.htm
 http://www.mobileradar.org/radar_descptn_2.html MobileRadar.org
 http://www.cckw.org/TM9-2800.htm Army manual TM 9-2800
 http://www.ibiblio.org/hyperwar/USMC/ref/Amphibious/Amphibious-5.html#armynavy Historic Mobilization Lists
 https://web.archive.org/web/20120507015819/http://www.signal.army.mil/ocos/museum/equipment.asp Fort Gordon Museum, SCR and BC list
 k-13/k-14 trailers
 http://www.tpub.com/content/radar/TM-11-487C-1/index.htm V-numbers
 http://www.maritime.org/doc/ecat/index.htm

Signal Corps vehicles
World War II American electronics
United States history-related lists
Signal Corps vehicles
U.S. Signal Corps vehicles
Military vehicles of the United States
United States military-related lists
Equipment of the United States Air Force
United States Army lists